Gökmen is a Turkish surname. Notable people with the surname include:

 Fatin Gökmen (born 1877), Turkish astronomer
 Jennifer Eaton Gökmen (born 1971), American writer and editor
 Rengim Gökmen (born 1955), Turkish conductor

Turkish-language surnames